Albert Aleksandrovich Gaun (born 21 June 1992 in Barnaul) is a Russian taekwondo practitioner.

External links
 

1992 births
Living people
Russian male taekwondo practitioners
Taekwondo practitioners at the 2015 European Games
European Games medalists in taekwondo
European Games silver medalists for Russia
European Taekwondo Championships medalists
World Taekwondo Championships medalists
Sportspeople from Barnaul
21st-century Russian people